Juan Félix Sánchez (16 May 1900 – 18 April 1997) was Andean folk artist born in San Rafael de Mucuchíes, Mérida, Venezuela. Sánchez' talents included weaving and sculpture, and he was also the architect and builder of the Chapel of San Rafael de Mucuchíes dedicated to the Our Lady of Coromoto at El Tisure, as well as several other small chapels.

While President of the Communal Meeting of San Rafael in 1929 - 1933, he organised the installation of a turbine to provide electricity to the town.

In the 1980s, he was the subject of a short film designed to "acknowledge and uncover the land, the beauty and the people of Venezuela" which received several awards.

Pictures

See also
 National Prize of Plastic Arts of Venezuela

References

1900 births
1997 deaths
People from Mérida (state)
Venezuelan sculptors
Venezuelan weavers
20th-century sculptors
20th-century Venezuelan architects
19th-century sculptors